Torch is an unincorporated community in Athens County, in the U.S. state of Ohio.

History
Torch had its start when the railroad was extended to that point. According to tradition, the community was named for the fact local churchgoers carried torches. A post office called Torch was established in 1851, and remained in operation until 2002.

References

Unincorporated communities in Athens County, Ohio
1851 establishments in Ohio
Populated places established in 1851
Unincorporated communities in Ohio